Wollter is a surname. Notable people with the name include:

Christopher Wollter (born 1972), Swedish actor
Karl-Anders Wollter (1927–2017), Swedish diplomat
Stina Wollter (born 1964), Swedish artist, television presenter and author
Sven Wollter (1934–2020), Swedish actor

See also
 Wolter
 Wolters

Swedish-language surnames